Status: It's Complicated (stylized as Status: It's Complicated!) is a 2013 Filipino comedy film directed by Chris Martinez, starring Jake Cuenca, Maja Salvador, Paulo Avelino, Solenn Heussaff, and Eugene Domingo. The film is distributed by Regal Films, and was shown  in theaters November 6, 2013, nationwide.

The film is inspired by and a remake of the 1979 classic sexy-comedy film Salawahan directed by Ishmael Bernal which originally starred Rita Gomez, Mat Ranillo III, Jay Ilagan, Rio Locsin, Sandy Andolong, and Bonching Miraflor.

Cast 
Jake Cuenca as Manny
Maja Salvador as Rina
Paulo Avelino as Jerry
Solenn Heussaff as Sylvia
Eugene Domingo as Marian David
Clarence Delgado as Dennis
Ria Garcia
Beatriz Saw
RR Enriquez
Marx Topacio
Madz Nicolas
Harrison Singer
Warren Singer
Lovi Poe as Shirley

References

External links
Status: It's Complicated at Box Office Mojo

2013 films
2013 comedy films
2010s Tagalog-language films
Regal Entertainment films
Remakes of Philippine films
Philippine comedy films
2010s English-language films
Films directed by Chris Martinez
2013 multilingual films
Philippine multilingual films